The following are the cities in the state of Tamil Nadu, India, which have a population of 1 lakh (100,000) and above (city / corporation area only), based on the 2011 census conducted by Government of India.

List of Cities in Tamil Nadu

See also 
 List of metropolitan areas in Tamil Nadu
 List of urban agglomerations in Tamil Nadu

References

Tamil Nadu-related lists
 Population
Tamil Nadu